Larisa Valentinovna Kadochnikova (born 30 August 1937, Moscow, USSR) is a Ukrainian actress. She appeared in Shadows of Forgotten Ancestors, a 1964 film directed by Sergei Paradjanov, and The Eve of Ivan Kupala.

Shadows of Forgotten Ancestors

Shadows of Forgotten Ancestors has been viewed as one of the most vivid and gratifying films of Soviet cinema as well as an exceedingly unorthodox one. The storyline revolves around two separated lovers caught in a family feud. The film created a stir worldwide, being praised for its direction, cinematography and soundtrack, among other aspects.

References

External links
 
 

1937 births
Living people
Actresses from Moscow
Ukrainian film actresses
Soviet film actresses
Recipients of the Order of Merit (Ukraine), 1st class
Recipients of the Order of Merit (Ukraine), 2nd class
Recipients of the Order of Merit (Ukraine), 3rd class
Recipients of the title of People's Artists of Ukraine
People's Artists of Russia
Recipients of the Shevchenko National Prize
Gerasimov Institute of Cinematography alumni